Rocket 88 is an album recorded live in Germany in 1981 by the boogie-woogie band Rocket 88. The band had a casual line-up, and founder/producer/band-member Ian Stewart in his liner notes makes reference to the other "permanent" band-members who were not present for that particular recording.
Although it is rumoured that there are numerous bootleg live takes from other concerts, it is the band's only officially released album. It was recorded using the Rolling Stones Mobile Studio.

Track listing 

Side 1

1. "Rocket 88" (Pete Johnson) 7:27

2. "Waiting for the Call" (Jack Bruce/Peter Brown) 10:16

3. "St. Louis Blues" (W.C. Handy) 7:55

Side 2

4. "Roll 'Em Pete" (Pete Johnson/Joe Turner) 5:52

5. "Swindon Swing" (Colin Smith) 7:34

6. "Roadhouse Boogie" (Pete Johnson) 7:17

7. "Talking About Louise" (Alexis Korner) 5:14

Line-up 

Alexis Korner (guitar/vocals on 4, 5, 6, 7)
Ian "Stu" Stewart (piano on 5)
Jack Bruce (bass/vocals on 2)
Charlie Watts (drums)
Colin Smith (trumpet)
John Picard (trombone)
Hal "Cornbread" Singer (tenor sax)
Don Weller (tenor sax)
Bob Hall (piano)
George Green (piano)

1981 live albums
1981 debut albums
Atlantic Records live albums
Albums produced by Ian Stewart (musician)